Songs from a Solitary Home is the second studio album by Norwegian band Major Parkinson. It was released on 13 September 2010.

Track listing
 "Ecophobia"
 "Solitary Home"
 "Teenage Mannequins"
 "Simone!"
 "Card Boxes"
 "The Age of the Paranoia"
 "Dance With the Cookieman"
 "Trampoline Superstar"
 "Downtown Boogie"
 "Heart of Hickory"
 "Domestic Violets"
 "Adville"
 "The Transient"

References

External links

Songs from a Solitary Home at Rate Your Music

2010 albums
Major Parkinson albums